Olunabad (also Romanized as ‘Oloonābād, Olūnābād, Alunābād, and Oloon Abad) is a village in Jabal Rural District, Kuhpayeh District, Isfahan County, Isfahan Province, Iran. At the 2006 census, its population was 159, in 80 families.

References 

Populated places in Isfahan County